Godar-e Arbu (also Romanized as Godār-e ‘Arbū; also known as Gardaneh-ye Godār ‘Arbū) is a village in Kuh Shah Rural District, Ahmadi District, Hajjiabad County, Hormozgan Province, Iran. At the 2006 census, its population was 150, in 40 families.

References 

Populated places in Hajjiabad County